Lars-Erik Berenett (23 December 1942 – 1 February 2017) was a Swedish actor. His career spanned more than 50 years, gaining recognition for his performances in film, television, and theatre, until two years before his death in 2017. Berenett made his theatrical debut in 1967 and continued to act in leading roles such as Jean in Miss Julie and Edgar in Dödsdansen.

Berenett was born in Skellefteå and grew up in Uppsala. He made his film debut in Vilgot Sjöman's Klänningen (1964). Berenett portrayed the police officer Roland Hassel in a total of 12 movies filmed and released between 1986–1992 and later in 2000 and 2012.

He died on 1 February 2017, after complications from a short-term illness in his home in Värmdö at the age of 71.

Early life 

Lars-Erik Berenett was born on 23 December 1942 in Skellefteå, but grew up in Uppsala. After working a time at sea, he found a job in a record store in Uppsala. During that time, he was discovered by amateur theater director Paul Patera, who arranged a scholarship for Berenett under the direction of Medborgarskolan's theater. Through additional scholarships, Berenett had the opportunity to study further at Calle Flygare's Theater School and at the Stage School in Gothenburg between 1964 and 1967. After graduating, he joined the Gothenburg City Theatre, where he remained until 1983.

Career 

In addition to theater, Berenett was active in film and television. Berenett made his professional acting debut in Vilgot Sjöman's Klänningen in 1964 where he played the messenger of Maison Georges. He is best known for his role as the temperamental police officer Roland Hassel in twelve films, made in 1986–1992 and in 2000 and 2012. He is also known for the role of Harald Bovallius in the soap opera Skilda världar, a role he played in over 300 episodes in the years 1996–1998. Berenett also often played villain roles, for example as the bank robber Erik Stigertz in the TV miniseries Polisen som vägrade svara (1982), a gangster called Charlie in the series Spanarna (1983) and the bomb man Rikard Kostner in the thriller series Den svarta cirkeln (1990). In contrast to the villain roles, he portrayed some likeable characters, such as the land-surveyor in Lars Molin's TV series Tre kärlekar (1989–1991). Berenett also played roles in Lars Norén productions such as Natten är dagens mor (1984) and Kaos är granne med Gud (1984).

Personal life 

Berenett married the actress Evabritt Strandberg in 1971. The marriage lasted five years, and they had a son together, the actor Matti Berenett (born 1971). He and his son played the roles of father and son in the series Skilda världar. A short time after the divorce with Strandberg, Berenett started a relationship with the actress Maria Kulle, with whom he had a second son.

Death 

On 1 February 2017, Berenett died in his home in Värmdö, Stockholm County, aged 71. According to his partner Maria Kulle's representative, Peter Jansson, he had died peacefully with his family at his side. The cause of his death was a short-term illness. Berenett is buried at Sandsborgskyrkogården in Stockholm.

Filmography

Film

Television

Theatre

References

External links 

 
 Swedish Film Database

1942 births
2017 deaths
20th-century Swedish male actors
21st-century Swedish male actors
Swedish male film actors
Swedish male stage actors
Swedish male television actors
People from Skellefteå Municipality